Peter I of Alençon (c. 1251 – 6 April 1284) was the son of Louis IX of France and Margaret of Provence.

He became Count of Alençon in 1269 and in 1284, Count of Blois and Chartres, and Seigneur de Guise in 1272 and 1284. He was also Count of Perche.

Life
Peter was born at Atlit, Kingdom of Jerusalem, while his father led the Seventh Crusade. Back in France, he lived in Paris until 1269 when his father gave him in appanage the County of Alençon. He accompanied his father to Tunis during Eighth Crusade (1270), but this expedition was a fiasco, because of the dysentery epidemic that decimated the army of crusaders. His father and his brother Jean Tristan succumbed to the disease.

Following the death of his father in 1270, Louis IX, Peter's brother Philip became king of France. One of Philip III's first acts was to name Peter as regent in the event of his death. Around that time, the chaplain Andrew of Hungary became attached to Peter's court. He wrote a history of the Charles of Anjou's conquest of Sicily and dedicated it to Peter.

In December 1282, during the Sicilian Vespers, Peter marched his army to Naples to assist his uncle Charles I of Sicily, stopping at Reggio Calabria. By January 1283, he was at Catona, a suburb of Reggio, when he was attacked by Aragonese mercenaries and killed. His body was taken to Paris, where he was buried, with his heart interred at the now-demolished church of the Couvent des Jacobins. After his death without surviving son, his portion of Alençon returned to the Crown. His widow did not remarry and sold Chartres in 1286 to King Philip IV the Fair. On her death Guise and Blois passed to her cousin Hugh of the House of Châtillon.

Marriage
Peter married in 1272 to Joan of Châtillon, which brought him the lands Blois, Chartres and Guise. They had two sons, namely:
 Louis (1276–1277)
 Philip (1278–1279)

Ancestry

References

Sources

1251 births

1284 deaths

13th-century French people

People from Haifa District
Sons of kings
Counts of Alençon
Counts of Perche
Counts of Blois
Counts of Chartres
Children of Louis IX of France
French military personnel killed in action
Christians of the Eighth Crusade